Hairy/enhancer-of-split related with YRPW motif protein 2 (HEY2) also known as cardiovascular helix-loop-helix factor 1 (CHF1) is a protein that in humans is encoded by the HEY2 gene.

This protein is a type of transcription factor that belongs to the hairy and enhancer of split-related (HESR) family of basic helix-loop-helix (bHLH)-type transcription factors. It forms homo- or hetero-dimers that localize to the nucleus and interact with a histone deacetylase complex to repress transcription. During embryonic development, this mechanism is used to control the number of cells that develop into cardiac progenitor cells and myocardial cells.  The relationship is inversely related, so as the number of cells that express the Hey2 gene increases, the more CHF1 is present to repress transcription and the number of cells that take on a myocardial fate decreases.

Expression  

The expression of the Hey2 gene is induced by the Notch signaling pathway. In this mechanism, adjacent cells bind via transmembrane notch receptors. Two similar and redundant genes in mouse are required for embryonic cardiovascular development, and are also implicated in neurogenesis and somitogenesis. Alternatively spliced transcript variants have been found, but their biological validity has not been determined.

Knockout studies  

The Hey2 gene is involved with the formation of the cardiovascular system and especially the heart itself.  Although studies have not been conducted about the effects of a malfunction in Hey2 expression in humans, experiments done with mice suggest this gene could be responsible for a number of heart defects. Using a gene knockout technique, scientists inactivated both the Hey1 and Hey2 genes of mice. The loss of these two genes resulted in death of the embryo 9.5 days after conception. It was found that the developing hearts of these embryos lacked most structural formations which resulted in massive hemorrhage. When only the Hey1 gene was knocked out, no apparent phenotypic changes occurred, suggesting that these two genes carry similar and redundant information for the development of the heart.

Clinical significance 

Common variants of SCN5A, SCN10A, and HEY2 (this gene) are associated with Brugada syndrome.

Interactions 

HEY2 has been shown to interact with Sirtuin 1 and Nuclear receptor co-repressor 1.

References

Further reading

External links 
 

Transcription factors